Valentina Kostenko (born 10 August 1993) is a Russian judoka.

She is the silver medallist of the 2018 Judo Grand Prix Antalya in the -63 kg category.

References

External links
 

1993 births
Living people
Russian female judoka
Universiade medalists in judo
Universiade bronze medalists for Russia
Medalists at the 2017 Summer Universiade
21st-century Russian women